The 57th Golden Bell Awards were held on October 21, 2022 and October 22, 2022 at the Sun Yat-sen Memorial Hall in Taipei, Taiwan. The ceremonies were televised by Sanlih E-Television (cable & digital) and Public Television Service (terrestrial). For the first time in the awards history, the winners for television awards were announced on two separate ceremonies – television show categories on October 21 and drama series categories on October 22, with the introduction of audience voting where viewers can vote for the Most Popular Drama Series and the Most Popular Variety Show.

Winners and nominees

Below is the list of winners and nominees for the television award categories. Winners are listed first and highlighted in boldface.

Special Contribution Award

Television Show

Program Awards

Individual awards

Technical Awards

Other Award

Drama Series

Program Awards

Individual awards

Technical Awards

Other Award

Popularity Award
The winners for Most Popular Drama Series and Most Popular Variety Show are announced on the day of the ceremonies. Nomination period ran from September 7 to September 30, 2022. Viewers will then select their favorite drama series and television show from the 5 nominees in each category through the official voting website til October 20, 2022.

Notes

References

External links
 Official website of the 57th Golden Bell Awards

2022
2022 television awards
2022 in Taiwan